Sir Richard Musgrave, 1st Baronet (1585 – 6 November 1615) was an English politician who sat in the House of Commons from 1604 to 1611.

Musgrave was the son of Christopher Musgrave and his wife Joan Curwen, daughter of Sir Henry Curwen of Workington, Cumberland. He succeeded to the estates of Hartley and Edenhall, Cumberland on the death of his grandfather Sir Simon Musgrave in 1597. He was knighted on 25 July 1603 on the coronation of James I. In 1604, he was elected Member of Parliament for Westmorland. He was created baronet on 29 July 1611.

Musgrave died at Naples at the age of 30 and was buried in the cathedral there.

Musgrave married Frances Wharton, daughter of Philip Wharton, 3rd Baron Wharton at the age of 14.

References

1585 births
1615 deaths
English MPs 1604–1611
Baronets in the Baronetage of England
People from Cumberland
Richard